Roy Bevis (born 26 February 1981) is an English professional wrestler. He mainly competes under the ring name Roy Knight in World Association of Wrestling, which is owned and operated by his family. He has wrestled alongside his father Ricky Knight, his younger half-brother Zak Zodiac and his son Ricky Knight Jr.; with his son, he is a one-time British Tag Team Champion in Revolution Pro Wrestling (RPW).

Professional wrestling career
At the age of 13, Bevis made his debut in Lingwood in Norfolk, as the Zebra Kid partnering with the Canary Kid in a tag-team match against Jamie Lee and the Brixton Brawler. Since then, he has been faced with many challengers, including the likes of Robbie Brookside, Doug Williams and his own father throughout many independent promotions in the United Kingdom. Bevis has not limited his career to the UK either, making appearances in the United States in 2002 for the now defunct Xtreme Pro Wrestling against Jonny Storm, Joey Matthews and Jerry Lynn.

Bevis' most high-profile work in the UK was for the W.A.W.; he made his Frontier Wrestling Alliance (FWA) debut in 2002 winning a four-way match against Paul Trevell, Scotty Rock and Mark Sloan at FWA Carpe Diem for an FWA All-England title match a few weeks later, a title he won. Throughout 2002 and 2003, Bevis traded FWA's All-England title back and forth with many of FWA's stars, but when Bevis vacated the belt due to injury on 18 October 2003, Hade Vansen won a provisional championship match against Flash Barker. On 26 March 2004, Bevis made his return in a last effort to win back the title in an undisputed FWA All England Championship match, but Vansen walked out of this match still the champion.

At FWA Carpe Diem in June 2004, Doug Williams defeated Bevis when Ricky Knight turned on him. This led to a long-lasting feud between father and son, which involved many of the Bevis family members. All of this was fuelled by Bevis' decision to wrestle full-time for the FWA instead of his father's promotion, World Association of Wrestling (WAW). In September 2004, this storyline came to an abrupt end when Bevis was jailed for nine months for drink-driving and for dangerous driving. After this spell in prison, promoters the FWA released a statement welcoming him back, saying: "While the FWA does not condone Roy's actions, we recognize that he has now served his sentence." During Frontiers of Honor, a cross-promotional show between FWA and Ring of Honor in the United Kingdom, Samoa Joe, their ROH Champion, faced The Zebra Kid in a match that would make the belt a "World Title" as it was being defended outside the United States.

After this Bevis would once again wrestle more for independent promotions in the United Kingdom, including his father's WAW, under the names "Roy Knight" and "Brian Knight". On 4 February 2006 at Real Deal Wrestling's King Of The Castle event, Bevis would make it to the tournament final to defeat Ricky Knight and win RDW Heavyweight Championship. However, not long after this WAW announced on their forum that he would be taking a break from wrestling, to sort out some health and personal issues.

Bevis made a return to the ring in 2007. In 2008, he went on to defeat Erik Isaksen (at The Talk, Norwich) to win become the first British wrestler to hold the WAW World Heavyweight Championship. Bevis would go on to make many successful title defences against Christian Eckstein, Danny Collins, Martin Stone and Scott Fusion. In October 2010, Bevis lost the WAW World Heavyweight Championship to Scott Fusion at WAW's annual spectacular; October OutRage 12. Fusion is the second British wrestler to hold the title.

On 19 November 2010 at a WAW show in Norwich, Bevis regained the WAW World Heavyweight Championship in a match featuring Scott Fusion teaming with Karl Krammer against Bevis and his father, Ricky Knight. The rules stipulated that if either man pinned either Fusion or Krammer, then Bevis would regain the title. Knight pinned Krammer for the victory and Bevis regained the title. He lost the championship to Danny Boy Collins in March 2012 in a Hardcore Tag Team match when he again teamed with his father against Collins and former ECW Champion Steve Corino. Collins won the title when he choked Bevis out after a missed Zebra Crossing.

Bevis has since reverted to the Roy Knight ring name and formed a tag team with his brother Zak Knight to become the UK Hooligans. In 2011, the UK Hooligans won the HEW Tag Team Championship from The Devil's Playboys (Bret Meadows and Sam Knee), and in September 2012, they defeated Army of Two (Scott Fusion and Aaron Sharpe) to win the vacant RQW European Tag Team Championship.

Personal life
Bevis is part of a professional wrestling family. His father and stepmother, known as Ricky Knight and Sweet Saraya respectively, are professional wrestlers, as are his half-siblings, Zak and Saraya-Jade. Saraya-Jade is signed to AEW under the ring name Saraya. The family run the World Association of Wrestling (WAW) promotion. In July 2012, Channel 4 produced a documentary about the Knights entitled The Wrestlers: Fighting with My Family. Bevis has three children, and his eldest son Ricky Knight Jr. is also a professional wrestler. In January 2022, Bevis became a grandfather for the first time after the birth of RKJ's child.

In September 2004, Bevis was jailed for nine months for drunk driving. In June 2005, he was arrested for affray, possessing an offensive weapon, and assaulting a police officer after throwing a beer bottle across a pub and possessing a knife on a night out. In August 2005, Bevis, playing as a striker for Thetford Town, knocked a referee unconscious during a match after being shown a red card. After the incident, Thetford Town stated that Bevis was no longer playing for or involved with the team.

Championships and accomplishments
All Star Wrestling
British Tag Team Championship (1 time) – with Ricky Knight
European Catch Tour Association
ECTA Tag Team Championship (1 time) – with Zak Knight
Frontier Wrestling Alliance
FWA All-England Championship (3 times)
Herts and Essex Wrestling
HEW Tag Team Championship (2 times) – with Zak Knight/Bexx
Power Of Wrestling
POW Tag Team Championship (1 time) – with Zak Knight
Premier Wrestling Federation
PWF Light Heavyweight Championship (1 time)
PWF Tag Team Championship (1 time) – with Ricky Knight
Preston City Wrestling
PCW Tag Team Championship (1 time) – with Zak Knight
Pro Wrestling Elite
PWE Tag Team Championship (1 time) – with Zak Knight
Pro Wrestling Illustrated
Ranked No. 385 of the top 500 singles wrestlers in the PWI 500 in 2018
Real Deal Wrestling
RDW Heavyweight Championship (1 time)
RDW European Championship (2 times)
Real Quality Wrestling
RQW World Heavyweight Championship (1 time)
RQW European Tag Team Championship (2 times) – with Zak Knight
Revolution Pro Wrestling
Undisputed British Tag Team Championship (1 time) – with Ricky Knight Jr.
Southside Wrestling Entertainment
SWE Tag Team Championship (1 time) – with Zak Knight
Target Wrestling
Target Wrestling Tag Team Championship (1 time) – with Zak Knight
World Association of Wrestling
WAW World Heavyweight Championship (5 times)
WAW British Heavyweight Championship (1 time)
WAW European Heavyweight Championship (1 time)
WAW British Cruiserweight Championship (1 time)
WAW World Tag Team Championship (6 times) – with the Canary Kid (2), Hot Stuff (1), Ricky Knight Jr. (1), Zak Knight (3)

References

1981 births
Living people
20th-century professional wrestlers
21st-century professional wrestlers
English male professional wrestlers
Sportspeople from Norwich
Undisputed British Tag Team Champions